Roggen is an unincorporated community and a U.S. Post Office in Weld County, Colorado, United States.  The Roggen Post Office has the ZIP Code 80652.

A post office called Roggen has been in operation since 1883. The community most likely derives its name from Edward P. Roggin, a Nebraska legislator.

Geography 
Roggen is located at  (40.168380,-104.371662).

Popular Culture
Roggen plays a minor part in Tom Clancy's novel The Sum of All Fears. Terrorists purchase a safe house near Roggen in preparation for attacking the Super Bowl being played in Denver.

Roggen is the topic of a creepypasta about an archaeological expedition sponsored by the fictional company "Candlelight Co."

See also
 List of cities and towns in Colorado

References

External links

Unincorporated communities in Weld County, Colorado
Unincorporated communities in Colorado